This article provides a brief snapshot of public listed IT companies in India. The following table lists IT companies in alphabetical order.

See also
List of Indian IT companies

References

 
Publicly traded companies by country
Software
Companies listed on the Bombay Stock Exchange